Xystophora psammitella is a moth of the family Gelechiidae. It was described by Snellen in 1884. It is found in the Russian Far East, Korea, China (Shaanxi) and Japan.

The wingspan is 11–12 mm.

References

Moths described in 1884
Xystophora